A calcium–aluminium-rich inclusion or Ca–Al-rich inclusion (CAI) is a submillimeter- to centimeter-sized light-colored calcium- and aluminium-rich inclusion found in carbonaceous chondrite meteorites. The four CAIs that have been dated using the Pb-Pb chronometer yield a weighted mean age of 4567.30 ± 0.16 Myr. As CAIs are the oldest dated solids, this age is commonly used to define the age of the Solar System.

Description
CAIs consist of minerals that are among the first solids condensed from the cooling protoplanetary disk. They are thought to have formed as fine-grained condensates from a high temperature (>1300 K) gas that existed in the protoplanetary disk at early stages of Solar System formations. Some of them were probably remelted later resulting in distinct coarser textures. The most common and characteristic minerals in CAIs include anorthite, melilite, perovskite, aluminous spinel, hibonite, calcic pyroxene, and forsterite-rich olivine.

Using the lead-lead isotope chronometer (‘Pb–Pb dating’), the absolute age of four CAIs have been calculated. They yield a weighted mean age of 4567.30 ± 0.16 Myr, which is often interpreted as representing the beginning of the formation of the planetary system (so-called ‘CAI time-zero). It is of note that all four Pb-Pb dated CAIs come from the same group of meteorite (CV chondrites).

See also
 Glossary of meteoritics

References

Bibliography
 MacPherson, G. J. (2004) "Calcium-aluminum-rich inclusions in chondritic meteorites." In Treatise on Geochemistry, Volume I, Meteorites, Comets, and Planets, A. M. Davis, edt., Elsevier, New York, pp. 201–246. 
 Krot, A. N. (September 2002) "Dating the Earliest Solids in our Solar System". Planetary Science Research Discoveries. http://www.psrd.hawaii.edu/Sept02/isotopicAges.html
 Shukolyukov A., Lugmair G.W. (2002) "Chronology of Asteroid Accretion and Differentiation", pp. 687–695, in Asteroids III, Bottke W.F., Cellino A., Paolicchi P., Binzel R.P., eds., University of Arizona Press (2002), 

Meteorite minerals
Solar System dynamic theories